Enchance is an album by American jazz drummer Billy Hart recorded in 1977 and released on the Horizon label.

Reception

The Allmusic review by Eugene Chadbourne states, "The album actually seems to be something like the essence of so many enjoyable directions in improvised music during this period, and is full of the excitement such activity is known for when the action on the bandstand is at its best".

Track listing
 "Diff Customs" (Oliver Lake) - 5:44  
 "Shadow Dance"" (Dave Holland) - 7:43  
 "Layla-Joy" (Billy Hart) - 6:55  
 "Corner Culture" (Dewey Redman) - 2:47  
 "Rahsaan is Beautiful" (Hannibal Marvin Peterson) - 4:31  
 "Pharoah" (Don Pullen) - 9:31  
 "Hymn for the Old Year" (Lake) - 8:48

Personnel
Billy Hart - drums, percussion
Oliver Lake - alto saxophone, soprano saxophone, flute
Dewey Redman - tenor saxophone (tracks 1-4, 6 & 7)
Hannibal Marvin Peterson - trumpet, koto
Eddie Henderson - trumpet, flugelhorn (tracks 1,3 & 5)
Don Pullen - piano, electric piano
Mark Gray - piano, electric piano  
Dave Holland (tracks 2, 4, 6 & 7), Buster Williams (tracks 1, 3 & 5) - bass
Michael Carvin - percussion (track 5)

References

1977 albums
Billy Hart albums
Horizon Records albums